Blaž Kavčič was the defending champion but decided not to participate.

Teymuraz Gabashvili won the tournament, after Alexander Kudryavtsev retiring in the final.

Seeds

  Teymuraz Gabashvili (champion)
  Alexander Kudryavtsev (final, retired)
  Radu Albot (semifinals)
  Evgeny Donskoy (second round)
  Aldin Šetkić (quarterfinals)
  Chen Ti (semifinals)
  Karen Khachanov (quarterfinals)
  Denys Molchanov (quarterfinals)

Draw

Finals

Top half

Bottom half

References
 Main Draw
 Qualifying Draw

Fergana Challenger - Men's Singles
2015 Men's Singles